Annie Zaidi may refer to:
 Annie Zaidi (writer) (born 1978), English-language writer from India
 Annie Zaidi (actress) (born 1963), Pakistani actress